The 2007 Fujitsu V8 Supercars Series was an Australian motor racing competition for V8 Supercars. It began on 1 March at the Adelaide Parklands Circuit and ended on 2 December at Phillip Island after seven rounds. The series was the eighth annual V8 Supercar Development Series.

The series was won by Tony D'Alberto driving a Holden VZ Commodore.

Race calendar
The series consisted of six rounds supporting the 2007 V8 Supercar Championship Series and one stand-alone round.

Teams and drivers
The following teams and drivers have competed during the 2007 Fujitsu V8 Supercar Series. This was the last year in which the Holden VX Commodore was eligible to compete in the series.

Series standings

Note: Chris Alajajian scored 26 points during the series but was penalized 10 points, leaving a final total of 16.

References

Fujitsu
Supercars Development Series